Jacob Epstein's bronze bust of Winston Churchill was completed in 1947 and cast in an edition often said to number 10 (but more, perhaps 12 or 16, are thought to exist).  Epstein was commissioned by the War Artists Advisory Committee to create a sculpture of former British prime minister Winston Churchill in August 1945, after the end of the Second World War and shortly after Churchill lost the 1945 UK general election. Two casts have been previously displayed in the Oval Office. Another remains on display in the atrium of Churchill College, Cambridge.

Background
Epstein applied to become a British official war artist after he was conscripted in the First World War, but his application was rejected.  Epstein was also not appointed as an official war artist in the Second World War, but he was asked to undertake six commissions for the War Artists Advisory Committee.  After completing bronze busts of a sailor, a soldier, and an airman – Admiral of the Fleet Sir Andrew Cunningham, General Sir Alan Cunningham, and Air Marshal Sir Charles Portal – and then a bust of Labour Party politician Ernest Bevin, Epstein accepted a commission to create busts of the independent politician John Anderson and former Conservative Party Prime Minister Winston Churchill.  He received the last two commissions in August 1945, the month after Churchill lost the 1945 UK general election, and just a few months after the end of the Second World War.

The bust of Anderson was completed quickly, but Churchill's bust was delayed as the politician could not find time to sit for the artist until December 1946 and January 1947.  By then, Churchill had left Downing Street, but his London residence at Hyde Park Gate was opposite Epstein's home.  After three sittings at the artist's studio, Epstein visited Churchill at Chartwell for three further settings.  While Epstein worked, Churchill smoked cigars and gave dictation to a procession of secretaries.

Description
In the words of the Imperial War Museum: "This is a powerful work. Churchill's ringed eyes display not only focus but also clarity of vision: the rough surface, his formidable grit and determination."

Casts
The work was completed in 1947 and cast in an edition often said to number 10 (but more, perhaps 12 or 16, are thought to exist).  The casts are extremely rare and valuable with one being exhibited at the Leicester Galleries in March 1947. Casts are held by Churchill College, Cambridge, the Imperial War Museum, the Iziko South African National Gallery, and the Centre Georges Pompidou. Other casts are held in private collections, including the Hallmark Cards art collection and The Marjorie Goodwin Collection.  Several examples have been sold at auction in recent years, including at Christie's in November 2011 for £97,250 (from the Epstein-Evans Collection), at Sotheby's in June 2004 for £182,500, at Bonhams in November 2014 for £100,900, at Sotheby's in June 2015 for £106,500, and at Christie's in November 2015 for £110,500.

A cast was donated to the White House in 1965, under the presidency of Lyndon B. Johnson, by a group of American wartime friends of Churchill, including W. Averell Harriman, and also Frederick L. Anderson, David K. E. Bruce, Ira C. Eaker and Carl Spaatz. In recent years, this cast has been displayed on the second floor of the White House, outside the Treaty Room, which is now part of the President's private rooms. In a 2015 press conference, President Barack Obama confirmed that the cast was moved partially to make way for a new bust of Martin Luther King Jr. in the Oval Office while reiterating his admiration to Churchill.  It was temporarily moved back into the Oval Office in January 2017, after the inauguration of Donald Trump, until it was replaced by a cast from the British Government Art Collection (GAC).

The GAC has two casts. One was acquired at auction in 1983. It has been in Washington, D.C. since at least July 2001, when it was loaned to the White House for display in the Oval Office during the presidency of George W. Bush, while the White House's own cast was being restored.  The GAC cast was returned to the British Embassy in Washington DC in 2009, after the end of Bush's term of office, and was ultimately moved to the British Ambassador's residence. Despite the fact that the bust was only intended to remain for the duration of Bush's presidency, its removal caused controversy among British and American conservatives, who interpreted it as an affront to the Special Relationship. Future Prime Minister Boris Johnson wrote in The Sun that the decision represented "the part-Kenyan president’s ancestral dislike of the British Empire,” while Mike Huckabee claimed that "he probably grew up hearing that the British were a bunch of imperialists who persecuted his grandfather." It was also criticized by Charles Krauthammer in an opinion-editorial for The Washington Post. Daniel Pfeiffer responded to these criticisms by pointing out that there were two busts and that one of them remained in Obama's private residence. 

The bust was ultimately returned to the Oval Office in January 2017 under the Trump presidency; before again being removed in 2021 as part of a re-design upon the election of Joe Biden which included busts of Rosa Parks and Cesar Chavez.

The GAC's second cast of the Epstein bust was acquired at auction in 1986, and is on display at the British Embassy in Paris.  The GAC also has two bronze busts of Churchill, and a small bronze sculpture of Churchill with his wife Clementine, all by Oscar Nemon.

See also
 Art in the White House

References

External links
 Sir Jacob Epstein, Bust of Sir Winston Leonard Spencer Churchill, Government Art Collection (in Washington DC, acquired 1983)
 Sir Jacob Epstein, Bust of Sir Winston Leonard Spencer Churchill, Government Art Collection (in Paris, acquired 1986)
 Jacob Epstein, correspondence with Ministry of Information, Imperial War Museum
 Bust of the Rt Hon Winston Churchill, Imperial War Museum
 Bust of Sir Winston Churchill, Centre Georges Pompidou
 Bust of Sir Winston Churchill, MacConnal-Mason Gallery 
 Sale at Christie's, 17 November 2011
 Sale at Sotheby's, 10–11 June 2014
 Sale at Bonhams, 17–18 November 2014 
 Sale at Sotheby's, 9–10 June 2015
 Sale at Christie's, 26 November 2015
 Busted: Blair gives public treasure to White House, The Guardian, 28 August 2005 
 White House admits it did return Winston Churchill bust to Britain , The Daily Telegraph, 29 July 2012
 The Case of the Two Churchills, The New Yorker, 1 August 2012
 Ted Cruz's claim that one of Obama's 'very first acts' was returning a bust of Churchill, The Washington Post, 27 January 2015 
 The Churchill Bust: Not Again!?, Richard M. Langworth, 15 November 2016
 The two Winston Churchill busts, Obama, Trump and Nigel Farage, iNews, 13 November 2016
 The Churchill bust is actually a tale of two statues, iNews, 20 November 2016
 Here's the real story about the Churchill bust in the Oval Office, The Washington Post, 23 January 2017 
 A White House Diary, Lady Bird Johnson, p. 327
 Winston Churchill, Hallmark Art Collection

 

1947 sculptures
Art in the White House
Bronze sculptures in England
Bronze sculptures in London
Bronze sculptures in Paris
Bronze sculptures in Washington, D.C.
Busts in the United Kingdom
Busts in Washington, D.C.
Churchill College, Cambridge
Sculptures by Jacob Epstein
Sculptures in Washington, D.C.
Sculptures of men in the United Kingdom
Sculptures of men in Washington, D.C.
Sculptures of Winston Churchill
Sculpture series